Watchu' Want for Christmas? is an EP (and first Christmas album) by swing revival group Big Bad Voodoo Daddy. It was released in 1997. The three Christmas songs also appear on the band's 2004 album Everything You Want for Christmas.

Track listing
"Rock-a-Billy Christmas"
"You & Me & The Bottle Makes 3 Tonight (Baby)"
"'Zat You Santa Claus"
"I Wan'na Be Like You (The Monkey Song)"
"Christmastime in Tinseltown (Again)"
"Go-Daddy-O"

Big Bad Voodoo Daddy albums
Christmas albums by American artists
1997 Christmas albums
1997 EPs
Swing Christmas albums